Acheilognathus yamatsutae is a species of cyprinid fish in the genus Acheilognathus. It is endemic to Korea and China.

Named in honor of Mr. K. Yamatsuta, a teacher at the Mukden Higher Girls School, who “obtained … a fine type specimen”.

References

Acheilognathus
Taxa named by Tamezo Mori
Fish described in 1928
Fish of East Asia
Cyprinid fish of Asia